C. A. (Chet) Bowers (June 4, 1935 July 13, 2017) was an American educator, author, lecturer and environmental activist. He wrote 27 books that focus on the cultural, linguistic, and technological roots of the current ecological crisis as well as the educational reforms necessary to promote greater ecological awareness.

Summary of ideas 
Over four decades, Chet Bowers reminded students, academics and activists that words have a history, that metaphors contain cultural perceptions that may be inadequate to address the challenges of the modern world. Bowers also contended that the digital age and computer learning, while broadly accepted as progressive and positive, have acted to homogenize cultural diversity and thought.

Fritjof Capra, physicist and founder of the Center for Ecoliteracy, said of him: "C. A. Bowers has argued eloquently [that] language is metaphoric, conveying tacit understandings shared within a culture."

In the preface of his book Pagans in the Promised Land, author Steven T. Newcomb, co-founder and co-director of the Indigenous Law Institute, said: "I learned of the importance of metaphors and metaphorical frameworks in the social construction of reality. Bowers helped me understand that metaphors are carriers of and therefore connected to complex metaphorical systems."

In her book The Resurgence of the Real, Body, Nature and Place in a Hypermodern World, Charlene Spretnak said: "One of the most astute critics of computer mediated learning, Chet Bowers, has focused attention on the largely unexamined ways in which computer use amplifies or reduces various cultural orientations." Spretnak discussed at some length Bowers's views on the ways in which the use of computers and digital information for education changes the educational process and culture, reinforcing "what Bowers calls 'the particular messianic ethos of modernity'".

Challenging orthodoxies 
Jerry Mander, in the book The Case Against the Global Economy said: 

In his book The False Promises of Constructivist Theories of Learning, Bowers referred to Gregory Bateson's idea that everything is in some form of relationship, and information exchange affects the life-forming and sustaining nature of the organism.

Cultural historian Thomas Berry, in his book The Great Work: Our Way into The Future wrote, "Another term coming into use is Earth literacy, as a basic context for educational programs from the earliest years through professional levels. Earth literacy is being fostered especially by educators such as David Orr of Oberlin College and Chet Bowers of Portland State."

The cultural commons 
In their book EcoJustice Education: Toward Diverse, Democratic and Sustainable Communities, Rebecca A. Martusewicz, Jeff Edumundson and John Lupinacci wrote: 

In his book The Way Forward: Educational Reforms that Focus on the Cultural Commons, Bowers provided a conceptual framework for understanding the ecological importance of the world's diversity of cultural commons and how this diversity is currently undermined by global market forces and digital technologies that overwhelm intergenerational communication. Bowers said that intergenerational knowledge and skills, which vary from culture to culture, are becoming increasingly important as population growth and changes in natural systems limit sources of food, water and other life-sustaining necessities.

Ecological intelligence 
Reviewing Bowers' book The Culture of Denial: Why the Environmental Movement Needs a Strategy for Reforming Universities and Public Schools, Eric Shibuya wrote:  Bowers argued that no one can exist independent of social and ecological relationships, and that the concept of personal autonomy has been championed at the expense of the environment for personal and corporate gain. Rolf Jucker, in his book Do We Know What We Are Doing, said: "Bowers points out that autonomy is an ideological construct of Western thinkers who did (and still do) not understand how thinking always reproduces even as it individualizes the taken-for-granted cultural patterns of thinking."

Critical reception
In "Toward Awakening Consciousness" (included in Cultural Studies and Environmentalism: The Confluence of EcoJustice, Place-based (Science) Education, and Indigenous Knowledge Systems) Michael L. Bently referred to Bowers as "a pioneer in identifying 'root metaphors' that shape our thinking and behavior".

Patrick Slattery in Curriculum Development in the Postmodern Era wrote that "Chet Bowers, like Jacques Cousteau, worries about what we are doing to the physical environment. However, Bowers advances the dialogue by asserting that modern liberalism and Enlightenment rationality have produced an emphasis on individualism and reasoning that prevents ecological sensibilities  and cooperative community efforts." Slattery also discussed Bowers's concept of "modern hubris" and aspects of Bowers's work.

Writing in the Encyclopedia of the Social and Cultural Foundations of Education Jeff Edmundson said: "Chet Bowers was an environmentalist before it became fashionable." Edmundson discussed Bowers's theory of "root metaphors", his opposition to the "assumptions of modernity", and the importance of the "commons".

Published work 
Reforming Higher Education in an Era of Ecological Crisis and Growing Digital Insecurity (2016) Process Century Press 
A Historical Detour that May Be Fatal:  What We Can Learn from the Luddite's Community-Centered Approach to Technology (2016) Eco-Justice Press 
A Critical Examination Of STEM: Issues and Challenges (2016) Routledge 
Digital Detachment: How computer culture undermines democracy (2016) Routledge 
An Ecological and Cultural Critique of the Common Core Curriculum (2015) New York: Peter Lang, 
The False Promises of the Digital Revolution: How Computers Transform Education, Work, and International development in Ways that Are Ecologically Unsustainable (2014) New York: Peter Lang, 
In the Grip of the Past: Educational Reforms that Address What Needs to be Conserved and What Needs to be Changed (2013) Eco-Justice Press 
The Way Forward: Educational Reforms that Focus on the Cultural Commons and the Linguistic roots of the Ecological Crisis (2012) Eco-Justice Press 
Educational Reforms for the 21st Century (2011) Eco-Justice Press 
University Reform in an Era of Global Warming (2011) Eco-Justice Press 
Perspectives on the Ideas of Gregory Bateson, Ecological Intelligence, and Educational Reforms (2011) Eco-Justice Press 
Revitalizing the Commons: Cultural and Educational Sites of Resistance and Affirmation (2006) New York: Peter Lang 
False Promises of Constructivist Theories of Learning: A Global and Ecological Critique (2005) New York: Peter Lang 
Rethinking Freire: Globalization and the Environmental Crisis (2004) Co-edited with Frederique Apffel-Marglin. Lawrence Erlbaum 
Mindful Conservatism: Rethinking the Ideological and Educational Basis of an Ecologically Sustainable Future (2003) Rowman & Littlefield 
Detras de la apariencia: hacia la descolonizacion de la educacion (2002) Proyecto Andino de Tecnologias Campesinas 
Educating for Eco-Justice and Community (2001) University of Georgia Press  
Let Them Eat Data: How Computers Affect Education, Cultural Diversity and the Prospects of Ecological Sustainability (2000) University of Georgia Press    (translated into Japanese and Mandarin)
The Culture of Denial: Why the Environmental Movement Needs a Strategy for Reforming Universities and Public Schools (1997) State University of New York Press 
Educating for an Ecologically Sustainable Culture: Rethinking Moral Education, Creativity, Intelligence and other Modern Orthodoxies (1995) State University of New York Press  
Critical Essays on Education, Modernity, and the Recovery of the Ecological Imperative (1993) New York: Teachers College Press 
Education, Cultural Myths, and the Ecological Crisis: Toward Deep Changes (1993) State University of New York Press  
The Cultural Dimensions of Educational Computing: Understanding the Non-Neutrality of Technology (1988)  New York: Teachers College Press  
The Promise of Theory: Education and the Politics of Cultural Change  (1984) New York: Teachers College Press

References

External links 
 "How Climate Change Makes Bioconservatism the Most Relevant Ideology" Truth-Out.org. 2016-11-26.
 
 
 
 
 
 
 
 
 
 
 

2017 deaths
1935 births
Lewis & Clark College alumni
Writers from Portland, Oregon
Portland State University alumni
University of California, Berkeley alumni
University of Oregon faculty
American non-fiction environmental writers